The women's +87 kg competition at the 2018 World Weightlifting Championships was held on 9–10 November 2018.

Schedule

Medalists

Records

Results

New records

References

External links
Results 
Results Group A
Results Group B
Results Group C

Women's 88 kg
2018 in women's weightlifting